Farm to Market Road 1187 (FM 1187) is an farm-to-market road located in the Dallas–Fort Worth metroplex of the U.S. state of Texas.

Route description
FM 1187 begins at Interstate 20 (I-20) west of Fort Worth, north of Aledo. The highway runs south to Aledo, where it intersects FM 5. Here, FM 1187 turns to the east. The highway turns back to the south and has a short overlap with U.S. Route 377 (US 377) near Benbrook Lake in the unincorporated community of Wheatland. The highway runs to the south of the central business district of Crowley before intersecting I-35W in southern Fort Worth. FM 1187 runs through Rendon before ending at US 287 Business in Mansfield, then becoming Debbie Lane.

History
FM 1187 was designated on July 14, 1949 from US 81 east  to Rendon. On May 23, 1951, FM 1187 was extended east  to US 287 (now Business US 287). On October 29, 1953, FM 1187 was extended west  to a county road. On October 25, 1954, the section of FM 1187 west of FM 731 was transferred to FM 731. On November 22, 1955, FM 1187 was extended west to FM 1902, replacing the section of FM 731 from FM 1187 to FM 1902. On November 24, 1959, FM 1187 was extended northwest to US 377. On December 20, 1984, FM 2376 from US 377 to FM 5 and the section of FM 5 from what was FM 2376 to US 80 were transferred to FM 1187.

On June 27, 1995, the section of FM 1187 from US 377 to Business US 287 was redesignated Urban Road 1187 (UR 1187). The designation of this segment reverted to FM 1187 with the elimination of the Urban Road system on November 15, 2018.

Major intersections

Crowley business loop

Business Farm to Market Road 1187-C (Bus. FM 1187-C) was a business loop of FM 1187 in Crowley, running along Main Street. The highway was designated on February 26, 2004, when FM 1187 was rerouted south of the city. On October 27, 2016, the business route was removed from the state highway system, with jurisdiction transferred to the city of Crowley.

Notes

References

1187
Transportation in Parker County, Texas
Transportation in Tarrant County, Texas
Transportation in Fort Worth, Texas